The Jacksonville Labor Temple is a historic building located at 228 South Mauvaisterre Street in Jacksonville, Illinois. The Jacksonville Trades and Labor Assembly, an organization of Jacksonville labor union members formed in 1892, constructed the building in 1904 to serve as its meeting house. Union construction workers volunteered to build the building, while its remaining costs were funded by a tax on the other unions. The building was the third labor temple built in the United States, after buildings in Los Angeles and Belleville, Illinois. Jacksonville's unions have held their meetings in the building since its construction, and it is now the oldest labor temple which is still in use.

The building was added to the National Register of Historic Places on November 13, 1980.

References

Commercial buildings on the National Register of Historic Places in Illinois
Buildings and structures completed in 1904
Buildings and structures in Morgan County, Illinois
National Register of Historic Places in Morgan County, Illinois
Labor movement in Illinois
Trade union buildings in the United States